Saint-Aubin-sur-Quillebeuf (literally Saint-Aubin on Quillebeuf) is a commune in the Eure department in Normandy in northern France.

The village was formerly called Wambourg (Wamburgum 1025, Weneborch 1147) and Saint-Aubin-de-Vambourg. The name was Anglo-Saxon in origin.

Population

See also
Communes of the Eure department

References

Communes of Eure